Ragnvald Martinsen (15 August 1906 – 15 December 1987) was a Norwegian cyclist. He competed in the individual road race at the 1928 Summer Olympics.

References

External links
 

1906 births
1987 deaths
Norwegian male cyclists
Olympic cyclists of Norway
Cyclists at the 1928 Summer Olympics
Cyclists from Oslo